Ceux du dehors (1981) is the third album by the Belgian RIO band Univers Zero. The title translates as "The Outsiders", which strongly alludes, among other things, to the Dark Fantasy works of HP Lovecraft.

The original LP consisted of six tracks. The CD pressing adds a seventh track, "Triomphe des mouches", previously released as a one-sided single.

Ceux du dehors was the first Univers Zero album without guitarist and founding member Roger Trigaux, who had left to form his own group, Present.

"La musique d'Erich Zann" is a collective group improvisation. The title alludes to the short story of the same name by H. P. Lovecraft; the players read the story in studio, then proceeded to record the piece.

Track listing
 "Dense" (Daniel Denis) – 12:26
 "La corne du bois des pendus" (Denis) – 8:42
 "Bonjour chez vous" (Denis) – 3:52
 "Combat" (Andy Kirk) – 12:53
 "La musique d'Erich Zann" (Denis, Kirk, Guy Segers, Michel Berckmans, Jean Debefve, Patrick Hanappier) – 3:29
 "La tête du corbeau" (Segers) – 3:11
 "Triomphe des mouches" (Denis, Kirk) – 5:36 (only on CD)

Personnel

Univers Zero
Guy Segers: Bass, Vocal, Clarinet
Andy Kirk: Harmonium, Organ, Piano, Yamaha CP70, Vocal
Michel Berckmans: English Horn, Bassoon, Oboe
Daniel Denis: Drums, Percussion, Harmonium, Vocal
Patrick Hanappier, Jean-Luc Aimé: Violin and Viola

Additional Personnel
Jean Debefre: Guest Hurdy-Gurdy
Thierry Zaboïtzeff: Guest Cello
Ilona Chale: Guest Vocal

Univers Zero albums
1981 albums